Paige Madison Bueckers (born October 20, 2001) is an American college basketball player for the UConn Huskies of the Big East Conference.

At Hopkins High School in Minnetonka, Minnesota, Bueckers was ranked as the number one recruit in her class by ESPN and received national high school player of the year honors. In her first season at UConn, Bueckers was a unanimous first-team All-American and became the first freshman to earn a major national women's college player of the year award, winning all four for which she was eligible. She led UConn to the Final Four of the 2021 NCAA tournament and set program records for assists by a freshman and single-game assists. Bueckers missed most of her sophomore season with a left knee injury but led her team to the national championship game. She was ruled out for her junior season with a torn anterior cruciate ligament (ACL). 

Bueckers has won three gold medals with the United States at the youth international level, including at the 2019 FIBA Under-19 World Cup, where she was named Most Valuable Player. She was a Youth Olympic gold medalist in 3x3 basketball and has played for the senior national 3x3 team. Bueckers was recognized as USA Basketball Female Athlete of the Year in 2019.

Early life and career
Bueckers was born on October 20, 2001, in Edina, Minnesota, and grew up in neighboring St. Louis Park. She started playing basketball at age five. As a child, she also played Little League Baseball as a catcher, as well as football and soccer, but focused on basketball by first grade. Bueckers became friends with future National Basketball Association (NBA) player Jalen Suggs while in elementary school. She was coached by her father in basketball until seventh grade. Bueckers drew inspiration from NBA players LeBron James and Kyrie Irving, and Women's National Basketball Association (WNBA) players Diana Taurasi and Sue Bird. She grew up supporting the Minnesota Lynx of the WNBA.

In seventh grade, Bueckers played for the tenth-grade and junior varsity basketball teams at Hopkins High School in Minnetonka. By that time, she was also playing year-round with North Tartan, an Amateur Athletic Union (AAU) program competing in the Nike Elite Youth Basketball League, a national circuit. Bueckers grew four inches in the year before her eighth-grade season. She joined Hopkins' varsity team in eighth grade under head coach Brian Cosgriff, averaging 8.9 points, 3.5 rebounds, 2.1 assists and 1.4 steals per game. She led her team in three-point shooting and ranked second in assists. Hopkins finished with a 28–3 record and a runner-up finish at the Class 4A state tournament, where Bueckers was named to the All-Tournament Team.

High school career
Bueckers made her freshman season debut for Hopkins High School on November 25, 2016, recording 28 points, five steals and four assists in a 74–34 win over Osseo Senior High School. That year, she assumed a more important role than in her eighth-grade season and became one of the team's leading scorers and passers. As a freshman, Bueckers averaged 20.8 points, 4.5 rebounds, 4.5 steals and 4.1 assists per game, earning All-Metro first team honors from the Star Tribune. She led Hopkins to a 31–1 record, its only loss coming against Elk River High School at the Class 4A state championship. Bueckers made the Class 4A All-Tournament Team.

In January 2018, as a sophomore, Bueckers was sidelined with an ankle injury that had been hurting her for the first two months of the season. She finished the season averaging 22.3 points, 6.8 assists and 5.9 rebounds per game. Bueckers helped Hopkins to a 28–4 record but suffered her third straight loss at the Class 4A state title game, despite leading all scorers with 37 points. She was named Star Tribune Metro Player of the Year, becoming the first sophomore to win the award since its creation 34 years earlier. Bueckers was also recognized as Minnesota Gatorade Player of the Year for athletic excellence, academic achievement and exemplary character.

As a junior on February 1, 2019, Bueckers scored a career-high 43 points in a 69–66 win over Wayzata High School and surpassed 2,000 career points. On March 16, despite having an illness that had caused her to vomit earlier in the day, she recorded 13 points, seven assists, five rebounds and five steals as her team won the Class 4A state championship, 74–45, over Stillwater Area High School. Hopkins finished the season with a 32–0 record. Bueckers averaged 24.4 points, 5.1 assists, 4.9 rebounds and 4.6 steals per game, repeating as Star Tribune Metro Player of the Year and Minnesota Gatorade Player of the Year. She was one of three finalists for the Gatorade National Player of the Year award. That year, Bueckers moved to the Minnesota Metro Stars AAU program, following her former North Tartan coach Tara Starks. In August 2019, she was named AAU Player of the Year by Prep Girls Hoops.

On January 29, 2020, during her senior season, Bueckers became the first female high school player to be featured on the cover of basketball magazine Slam. Toward the end of the season, she suffered from a stress reaction in her right leg due to overuse. Bueckers sometimes wore a walking boot as a preventative measure, was limited in practice and missed the first game of the state tournament. She led Hopkins to the Class 4A state championship game, which was canceled on March 13 amid the COVID-19 pandemic. Bueckers was selected to play at the McDonald's All-American Game and the Jordan Brand Classic, two prestigious high school all-star games, but both were canceled due to the pandemic. She averaged 21.4 points, 9.4 assists, 5.4 steals and five rebounds per game, leading Hopkins to another undefeated season and 62 consecutive wins. Bueckers was again honored as Star Tribune Metro Player of the Year, becoming the award's first three-time winner. She was named Gatorade Female High School Athlete of the Year, Gatorade National Player of the Year, Naismith Prep Player of the Year, Morgan Wootten National Player of the Year, and Minnesota Miss Basketball. Bueckers finished as Hopkins' all-time leader in points (2,877), assists (795) and steals (574).

Bueckers has been regarded as one of the best players in Minnesota girls' high school basketball history. During her senior season, Star Tribune columnist Chip Scoggins compared her influence in the state to that of Lindsay Whalen, writing, "A generation of girls—now young women—throughout the Twin Cities and greater Minnesota grew up idolizing [Whalen] as a basketball star. Bueckers is having that same impact on a new generation of girls."

Recruiting
Bueckers was a five-star recruit and ranked the number one player in the 2020 class by ESPN. By eighth grade and age 14, she had received scholarship offers from NCAA Division I basketball programs at Minnesota, Iowa State and Illinois. On April 1, 2019, Bueckers announced her commitment to University of Connecticut. The other finalists she was considering were Notre Dame, Oregon State, Oregon, UCLA, Minnesota, South Carolina, Maryland, Texas and Duke. On November 13, Bueckers signed a National Letter of Intent with UConn. She became the 11th number-one recruit to sign and attend UConn since 1998. Bueckers was drawn to UConn because she felt that head coach Geno Auriemma would maximize her talents, and because of the university's reputation and enthusiasm for women's basketball. She also believed that she could immediately have a key role at UConn, with the expected graduation of point guard Crystal Dangerfield, and was attracted by its team-oriented play style.

College career

Freshman season
Entering her freshman season at UConn, sports publications described Bueckers as the program's most hyped recruit since Breanna Stewart in 2012. Unlike Stewart and other former UConn stars, she became her team's leader from the beginning of her college career. Megan Walker, UConn's top scorer from the previous year, had opted to forgo her senior season to enter the 2020 WNBA draft, leaving the 2020–21 team with no seniors. Bueckers was unanimously selected as the Big East Preseason Freshman of the Year by the league's coaches.

On December 12, 2020, Bueckers made her collegiate debut for UConn, recording 17 points, nine rebounds, five assists and five steals in a 79–23 win over UMass Lowell. On January 21, 2021, she made a three-pointer with 25 seconds left to help defeat rival Tennessee, 67–61, despite shooting 3-of-14 from the field for a season-low nine points. Late in the game, Bueckers sprained her ankle, causing her to miss the next contest against Georgetown. On February 3, she posted a season-high 32 points and seven assists in a 94–62 victory over St. John's of New York. It was the highest-scoring performance by a UConn freshman since Tina Charles in 2007. Two days later, she scored 30 points in an 87–58 win over Marquette. In her next game, Bueckers recorded 31 points, six steals and five assists, scoring her team's final 13 points, in a 63–59 overtime win over South Carolina, the number one team in the AP Poll. She became the first player in program history to have three straight 30-point games. On February 27, Bueckers posted 20 points, a program-record 14 assists and seven rebounds in a 97–68 victory over Butler. After leading UConn to the Big East regular-season title, she was named Big East Player of the Year and unanimous Big East Freshman of the Year, joining Maya Moore as the only players to win both awards in the same season. She was also an unanimous first-team All-Big East and Big East All-Freshman Team selection. On March 8, Bueckers recorded 23 points, six rebounds and four assists in a 73–39 win over Marquette at the Big East tournament title game. She was named most outstanding player (MOP) of the tournament.

On March 21, Bueckers recorded 24 points, nine rebounds, six assists, and four steals in a 102–59 win over 16th-seeded High Point in the first round of the 2021 NCAA tournament. Her 24 points were the most by a UConn player in their tournament debut. Bueckers scored a game-high 28 points in a 69–67 win over second-seeded Baylor in the Elite Eight to help UConn reach its 13th straight Final Four. She was recognized as MOP of the River Walk Regional. At the Final Four, UConn was upset by third-seeded Arizona, 69–59, and finished the season with a 28–2 record. Bueckers was named to the Final Four All-Tournament Team. She won all the national player of the year awards she was eligible for—AP Player of the Year, Naismith College Player of the Year, USBWA Women's National Player of the Year and the John R. Wooden Award—becoming the first freshman to receive any of the awards. Bueckers was a unanimous first-team All-American: she earned first-team All-American honors from the AP and the USBWA, and made the Women's Basketball Coaches Association (WBCA) Coaches' All-America Team. She was the first freshman to win the Nancy Lieberman Award as the top point guard in the nation. Bueckers shared two major NCAA Division I freshman of the year awards with Caitlin Clark of Iowa—the Tamika Catchings Award, presented by the USBWA, and the WBCA Freshman of the Year award. As a freshman, she averaged 20 points, 5.8 assists, 4.9 rebounds and 2.3 steals per game, shooting 46.4 percent from three-point range. Bueckers recorded 168 assists, the most by a freshman in program history, despite a shortened season due to the COVID-19 pandemic. In July 2021, she won the Best Female College Athlete ESPY Award. Analysts have considered Bueckers' freshman season to be among the best in UConn and NCAA history.

Bueckers was named to the university's dean's list her freshman year, which required a GPA of at least 3.72, and was involved in social justice causes.

Sophomore season

On April 30, 2021, Bueckers underwent surgery on her right ankle to repair an osteochondral defect, joint damage involving the bone and cartilage. She could not practice for most of the offseason while recovering from surgery, but was cleared to return by October. Bueckers entered her sophomore season as a unanimous selection for both Big East Preseason Player of the Year and the AP preseason All-America team. Among the newcomers to UConn was Azzi Fudd, the number one recruit in the 2021 class and Bueckers' close friend.

Bueckers made her season debut on November 14, 2021, recording a career-high 34 points, six rebounds and four assists in a 95–80 win against Arkansas. She matched the program record for points in a season opener set by Kerry Bascom in 1989. On December 5, Bueckers injured her left knee while dribbling the ball up the court with 40 seconds remaining in a 73–54 victory over Notre Dame, and had to be carried off the floor by teammates. An MRI and CT scans revealed that she suffered a tibial plateau fracture with an estimated recovery period of six to eight weeks. On December 13, Bueckers underwent surgery to repair the fracture and a previously undisclosed lateral meniscus tear. She was expected to be sidelined for eight more weeks. During Bueckers' absence, UConn had a 15–4 record and briefly fell out of the top 10 in the AP Poll for the first time since 2005. The team's winning streaks of 240 games against unranked teams and 169 games against conference opponents ended in losses to Georgia Tech and Villanova, respectively.

Bueckers was cleared to return against St. John's on February 25, 2022. She came off the bench for the first time in her career and scored eight points, playing only 13 minutes due to a minutes restriction, in a 93–38 victory. Bueckers continued to receive limited playing time until the NCAA tournament, and UConn won the Big East tournament despite her scoring only two points in the championship game against Villanova. Her offensive production also declined from before her injury. On March 28, at the Elite Eight of the NCAA Tournament, Bueckers led her team to a 91–87 double-overtime win over top-seeded NC State, as UConn reached its 14th consecutive Final Four. She scored a game-high 27 points on 10-15 from the field, including 15 points in the two overtime periods (4-5 from the field and 6-6 from the free-throw line), and was named MOP of the Bridgeport Regional. In the Final Four, Bueckers recorded 14 points, five assists and four rebounds in a 63–58 victory against top-seeded Stanford, the defending champions. In a 64–49 loss to top-seeded South Carolina at the national championship game, Bueckers was the only UConn player to score in double digits as she posted 14 points and six rebounds, and was named to the Final Four All-Tournament Team. Bueckers was an AP All-American Honorable Mention selection. As a sophomore, she averaged 14.6 points, four rebounds and 3.9 assists per game.

In addition to her athletic honors, Bueckers was again named to the university's dean's list for her first semester as a sophomore.

Junior season 
On August 3, 2022, UConn announced that Bueckers had torn the anterior cruciate ligament (ACL) in her left knee during a pick-up game on August 1 and would miss the entire 2022–23 season. On September 1, Bueckers announced she would return to UConn for the 2023–24 season instead of declaring for the 2023 WNBA draft, for which she is age-eligible. While sidelined, she remained closely involved with the team, providing leadership and support for players.

National team career

Bueckers represented the United States at the 2017 FIBA Under-16 Women's Americas Championship in Buenos Aires, Argentina. In five games, she averaged 11 points, three steals, 2.8 rebounds and 2.2 assists per game, helping her team win the gold medal. Bueckers played at the 2018 FIBA Under-17 Women's World Cup in Minsk, Belarus. In seven games, she averaged 9.7 points, 4.7 assists and 3.6 rebounds per game, leading the tournament in assist-to-turnover ratio at 4.13. Bueckers led the United States to a gold medal after recording eight points and ten assists versus France in the final.

At the 2019 FIBA Under-19 Women's Basketball World Cup in Bangkok, Thailand in July, Bueckers averaged 11.6 points, 4.1 rebounds and a tournament-high 5.4 assists per game. She posted 17 points, eight rebounds and five assists in a 74–70 overtime win over Australia for the gold medal. Bueckers was named Most Valuable Player and made the All-Tournament Team. On December 10, 2019, she was honored as USA Basketball Female Athlete of the Year.

3x3 basketball
In October 2018, Bueckers won a gold medal for the United States in 3x3 basketball at the Summer Youth Olympics in Buenos Aires, helping her team win all seven of its games. She was the youngest member of the senior national team at the 2019 World Beach Games in Doha, Qatar, on a roster featuring WNBA players Napheesa Collier and Jackie Young. Bueckers averaged 6.5 points per game, second-highest on the team, as the United States lost to Brazil in the quarterfinals and finished in fifth place.

Player profile

Since high school, Bueckers has received considerable attention as one of the top players of her generation. Following her sophomore season at Hopkins, Star Tribune reporter Jim Paulsen proclaimed her a "once-in-a-generation talent". As a freshman in college, Bueckers was called "the best player in basketball" by former UConn star Diana Taurasi, and a "generational player" by South Carolina coach Dawn Staley.

Bueckers stands  and plays the point guard position. She has a slim build, which encourages opposing teams to force her to play through contact, and displays quickness and agility. An adept passer and ball handler, Bueckers has described herself as a "pass-first" player. She exhibits a high level of court awareness, with the ability to make quick decisions while anticipating the defense. In March 2021, analyst Monica McNutt touted Bueckers as "arguably one of the best playmakers in the game". Bueckers scores efficiently both at the rim and from three-point range. Her pull-up jump shot has been described as her signature move, and she is a skilled mid-range shooter. Her playing style has frequently drawn comparisons to Taurasi.

Career statistics

College

|-
| style="text-align:left;"| 2020–21
| style="text-align:left;"| UConn
| 29 || 28 || 36.2 || 52.4 || 46.4 || 86.9 || 4.9 || 5.7 || 2.3 || 0.4 || 2.5 || 20.0

|-
| style="text-align:left;"| 2021–22
| style="text-align:left;"| UConn
| 17 || 13 || 29.1 || 54.4 || 35.3 || 71.4 || 4.0 || 3.9 || 1.5 || 0.6 || 1.7 || 14.6 
|}

Off the court

Personal life

Bueckers' father, Bob Bueckers, is a software engineer and played high school basketball as a point guard. Her mother, Amy Fuller (née Dettbarn), represented the University of St. Thomas in cross country and track and field. When Bueckers was three years old, her parents divorced. She remained with her father while her mother remarried and moved to Billings, Montana. Her father also began a new relationship and later had a son, Drew. Bueckers has another younger brother, Ryan, and a younger sister, Lauren.

She is a Christian and attributes her confidence and success on the basketball court to God.

She has hosted a charity basketball clinic called "Buckets with Bueckers" for young athletes in Minnesota and Montana.

Bueckers has voiced support for the Black Lives Matter movement, in part because her brother, Drew, whom she has described as her best friend, is biracial. She participated in marches for racial justice after the murder of George Floyd in her home state of Minnesota. During her acceptance speech at the 2021 ESPY Awards, Bueckers celebrated and honored Black women, bringing attention to the racial disparities in media coverage of women's basketball players.

Business interests
Bueckers is represented by agent Lindsay Kagawa Colas of Wasserman. She signed with Wasserman as a name, image and likeness (NIL) client in August 2021, about one month after the NCAA allowed student-athletes to be compensated for the use of their NIL. Described as the "face of NIL" for women's basketball by The Athletic, industry analysts have projected her as having one of the highest earning potentials from NIL among college athletes, because of both her success in basketball and her large social media following. On April 4, 2022, her Instagram account reached one million followers, making her reportedly the first women's college basketball player to achieve the mark. In 2022, Bueckers was named to the Fortune 40 Under 40 list, which honors influential young people in business, and The Athletic'''s College Sports 40 Under 40 list, which recognizes the most influential young people in the college sports industry. She was also the inaugural winner of the Best NIL Athlete of the Year award by Sports Business Journal''.

In November 2021, Bueckers signed her first two major endorsement deals. The first was with footwear and apparel marketplace StockX, specifically for the company's basketball and women's sports lines. While she will continue to wear Nike apparel in games due to UConn's contract with the company, she will wear other brands while promoting StockX off the court. The second deal was with Gatorade, who signed her as its first college athlete. On February 7, 2022, Bueckers announced her third major partnership with mobile payment service Cash App. Through the deal, she launched the Paige Bueckers Foundation, which aims to promote social justice and create opportunities for families and children. On March 31, Bueckers became the first student-athlete brand ambassador for the education platform Chegg. Working with the nonprofit branch of Chegg, she partnered with hunger relief company Goodr to host a free pop-up grocery market in Minneapolis to address food insecurity among college students. On June 13, Bueckers announced a partnership with Crocs. On September 19, she announced a deal with Bose. On November 28, Bueckers and her college teammate, Azzi Fudd, announced that they had signed deals with Nerf.

In May 2022, Bueckers was named executive producer of WBB Takeover as part of a two-day basketball showcase hosted by the sports media brand Overtime. She also coached and served as a commentator alongside fellow college players Aliyah Boston and Haley Jones during the event.

Bueckers' scoring success has earned her the nickname "Paige Buckets". On July 13, 2021, she filed for a trademark on the nickname for use on athletic apparel, such as shirts, pants, jackets, footwear, hats and uniforms.

Awards and honors
College
 Best Female College Athlete ESPY Award (2021)
 AP Player of the Year (2021)
 Naismith College Player of the Year (2021)
 USBWA National Player of the Year (2021)
 John R. Wooden Award (2021)
 Nancy Lieberman Award (2021)
 Unanimous first-team All-American (2021)
 AP All-American Honorable Mention (2022)
 USBWA National Co-Freshman of the Year (2021)
 WBCA Co-Freshman of the Year (2021)
 2× Final Four All-Tournament Team (2021, 2022)
 Big East Player of the Year (2021)
 First-team All-Big East (2021)
 Big East Freshman of the Year (2021)
 Big East All-Freshman Team (2021)
 Big East tournament  (2021)
High school
 Gatorade Female Athlete of the Year (2020)
 Gatorade National Player of the Year (2020)
 Morgan Wootten National Player of the Year (2020)
 Naismith Prep Player of the Year (2020)
 McDonald's All-American (2020)
 Jordan Brand Classic (2020)
 Minnesota Miss Basketball (2020)
National team
 USA Basketball Female Athlete of the Year (2019)
 FIBA Under-19 World Cup MVP (2019)
 FIBA Under-19 World Cup All-Tournament Team (2019)

Notes

References

External links
UConn Huskies bio
USA Basketball bio
ESPN Player Overview

2001 births
Living people
American women's basketball players
Basketball players at the 2018 Summer Youth Olympics
Basketball players from Minnesota
Christians from Minnesota
Hopkins High School alumni
McDonald's High School All-Americans
Parade High School All-Americans (girls' basketball)
People from St. Louis Park, Minnesota
Point guards
Sportspeople from Edina, Minnesota
UConn Huskies women's basketball players
Youth Olympic gold medalists for the United States